Perlenbach is a river of North Rhine-Westphalia, Germany and eastern Belgium. Its source is in the Belgian High Fens, north of Büllingen. It is dammed up to create a lake, before flowing from the right into the Rur near Monschau.

See also
Perlenbach Valley
List of rivers of North Rhine-Westphalia

References

Rivers of the Eifel
Rivers of North Rhine-Westphalia
Rivers of Belgium
Belgium–Germany border
Rivers of Germany
Rivers of Liège Province
International rivers of Europe
Border rivers